Ljuba is a Slavic given name. In the Serbian language, it is best known as a masculine name, cognate to Ljubomir or Ljubo. In other Slavic languages it's more often a feminine name (Czech, Bulgarian, Macedonian), cognate to Lyubov, and also spelled Lyuba (Bulgarian Люба), Luba (Ukrainian and Russian Люба; Czech, Polish), Ľuba (Slovak).

The masculine name may refer to:

 Ljuba Aličić, Serbian Romani folk singer
 Ljuba Brkić, Serbian pianist and piano teacher
 Ljuba Čupa, Serbian soldier
 Ljuba Jezdić, Serbian lawyer and soldier
 Ljuba Tadić, Serbian actor

The feminine name may refer to:

 Ljuba Kristol, Israeli chess grandmaster of Russian origin
 Ljuba Prenner, Slovene lawyer and writer (assigned female at birth and a feminine name)
 Ljuba Welitsch, Bulgarian actress
 Lyuba Mollova, Bulgarian athlete
 Lyuba Ognenova-Marinova, Bulgarian archeologist
 Luba Blum-Bielicka, Polish nurse and activist
 Luba Genush, Canadian artist of Ukraininan origin
 Luba Golovina, Georgian trampolinist of Russian descent
 Luba Goy (born 1945), Canadian actress and comedian of Ukrainian/German origin
 Luba Jurgenson, French writer of Russian/Estonian origin
 Luba Kadison, Lithuanian Jewish actress
 Luba Lowery, Russian-born American paralympic athlete
 Luba Lukova, American visual artist of Bulgarian origin
 Luba Marks, an American fashion designer and former French-Russian ballet dancer
 Luba Mason, American singer and actress of Slovak descent
 Luba Mirella, Italian opera singer of Polish origin
 Luba Mushtuk, Russian dancer and choreographer
 Luba Robin Goldsmith, Ukrainian-born American physician and clubwoman
 Luba Skořepová, Czech actress
 Luba Sterlikova, Russian-American artist
 Luba (singer) (born 1958), Canadian music artist of Ukrainian descent
 Ľuba Lesná, Slovak writer
 Ľuba Orgonášová, Slovak opera singer

Derivative forms include Ljubica, Ljupka, Ljubinka, Ľubica, Ljubana.

Serbian masculine given names
Croatian feminine given names
Serbian feminine given names
Czech feminine given names
Slovak feminine given names
Bulgarian feminine given names
Slovene feminine given names